The women's triple jump event at the 1992 World Junior Championships in Athletics was held in Seoul, Korea, at Olympic Stadium on 17 September.

Medalists

Results

Final
17 September

Participation
According to an unofficial count, 15 athletes from 12 countries participated in the event.

References

Triple jump
Triple jump at the World Athletics U20 Championships